Martina Trchová (born 14 February 1983) is a Czech singer. Her 2016 album Holobyt, which can be translated into English as Unfurnished Flat, won the Folk & Country category at the 2016 Anděl Awards.

Discography

Studio albums
2005: Čerstvě Natřeno
2010: Takhle ve mně vyjou vlci
2016: Holobyt

References

External links

1983 births
Living people
Musicians from Prague
21st-century Czech women singers